Chepetskiy Mechanical Plant is a company based in Glazov, Russia and established in 1946. It is part of TVEL, a Rosatom subsidiary.

The Chepetskiy Mechanical Plant Association is a leading producer of metallic calcium, zirconium, and depleted uranium, and equipment and materials for nuclear energy.

References

External links
 Official website

Manufacturing companies of Russia
Companies based in Udmurtia
Rosatom
Ministry of Medium Machine Building
Manufacturing companies of the Soviet Union